The following is a list of Japanese women writers and manga artists.

A
Hotaru Akane (born 1983), blogger, lyricist
Akiko Akazome (1974–2017), novelist
Akazome Emon (956–1041), waka poet
Risu Akizuki (born 1958), manga writer
Akira Amano (born 1973), manga writer
Chihiro Amano (born 1982), screenwriter
Kozue Amano (born 1974), manga writer
Moyoco Anno (born 1971), manga writer, fashion writer
Yasuko Aoike (born 1948), manga writer
Kotomi Aoki (born 1980), manga writer
Ume Aoki, manga writer
Nanae Aoyama (born 1983), novelist
Kiyoko Arai, manga writer
Motoko Arai (born 1960), science fiction and fantasy writer
Hiromu Arakawa (born 1973), manga writer
Hiro Arikawa (born 1972), light novelist
Sawako Ariyoshi (1931–1984), writer, novelist
Mariko Asabuki (born 1984), novelist
Yū Asagiri, manga writer
Makate Asai (born 1959), novelist
Maki Asakawa (1942–2010), lyricist
George Asakura (born 1974), manga writer
Hinako Ashihara, manga writer
Izumi Aso (born 1960), manga writer

B
Mariko Bando

C
Toriko Chiya, manga writer
Fukuda Chiyo-ni (1703–1775), poet
Nanae Chrono (born 1980), manga writer

D
Tamaki Daido (born 1966), novelist, essayist

E
Eiki Eiki (born 1971), manga writer
Fumiko Enchi (1905–1986)
Maki Enjōji, manga writer
Nariko Enomoto (born 1967), manga writer
Makiko Esumi (born 1966), writer, essayist, lyricist

F
Mihona Fujii (born 1974), manga writer
Kazuko Fujita (born 1957), manga writer
Kaori Fujino (born 1980), novelist
Cocoa Fujiwara (1983–2015), manga writer
Hiro Fujiwara (born 1981), manga writer

G
Empress Genmei (660–721)

H
Moto Hagio (born 1949), manga writer
Hani Motoko (1873–1957), journalist
Hayashi Fumiko (1903–1951), novelist and poet
Maha Harada (born 1962), novelist
Nanae Haruno manga writer
Hasegawa Shigure (1879–1941), playwright, editor
Machiko Hasegawa (1920–1992), manga writer
Sugako Hashida (1925–2021), scriptwriter
Isoko Hatano (1905–1978), writer and developmental psychologist
Bisco Hatori (born 1975), manga writer
Miyuki Hatoyama (born 1943), actor, writer
Mariko Hayashi (born 1954), novelist, essayist
Akiko Higashimura (born 1975), manga writer
Asa Higuchi (born 1970), manga writer
Keiko Higuchi (born 1932), writer, journalist
Higuchi Tachibana (born 1976), manga writer
Aoi Hiiragi (born 1962), manga writer
Kaoruko Himeno (born 1958), novelist, essayist
Saeko Himuro (1957–2008), novelist, essayist
Matsuri Hino manga writer
Taiko Hirabayashi (1905–1972), writer
Raichō Hiratsuka (1886–1971), writer, activist, feminist, founder of Bluestocking (magazine)
Tatsuko Hoshino (1903–1984), haiku poet
Chieko Hosokawa (born 1935), manga writer
Yumi Hotta (born 1957), manga writer
Ichiyo Higuchi (1872–1896), writer

I
Yumiko Igarashi
Koi Ikeno
Gō Ikeyamada
Ryo Ikuemi
Natsuko Imamura (born 1980), novelist
Etsu Inagaki Sugimoto
Lady Ise
Ise no Taifu
Yuka Ishii (born 1963), novelist
Michiko Ishimure
Noe Itō
Risa Itō
Natsumi Itsuki
Mariko Iwadate
Kaneyoshi Izumi
Izumi Shikibu

K
Mitsuyo Kakuta
Yoko Kamio
Hitomi Kanehara (born 1983), novelist
Aya Kanno
Junko Karube
Lady Kasa
Maki Kashimada (born 1976), novelist
Kazuyo Katsuma
Kazune Kawahara
Yumiko Kawahara
Hiromi Kawakami
Kikuko Kawakami
Mieko Kawakami (born 1977), novelist, essayist, poet
Mizuki Kawashita
Kazumi Kazui
Yuko Takada Keller
Toshie Kihara
Yuki Kiriga
Kishi Joō
Rio Kishida
Yao Kitabatake
Nobori Kiuchi (born 1967), novelist
Miyuki Kobayashi
Kodai no Kimi
Yun Kōga
Marie Kondo
Fumiyo Kōno
Natsuki Koyata (born 1981), novelist
Natsuko Kuroda (born 1937), novelist
Tetsuko Kuroyanagi

M
Sonoko Machida (born 1980), novelist
Miyako Maki
Sanami Matoh
Nina Matsumoto
Temari Matsumoto
Akemi Matsunae
Asa Matsuoka
Kyoko Matsuoka (1935–2022), children's author and translator
Akimoto Matsuyo
Michitsuna no Haha
Mitsukazu Mihara (born 1970), manga writer
Kanan Minami
Kazuka Minami
Kazuya Minekura
Suzue Miuchi
Ayako Miura
Shion Miura (born 1976), novelist, essayist
Yuriko Miyamoto
Hideko Mizuno
Junko Mizuno
Setona Mizushiro
Milk Morinaga
Akiko Morishima
Tama Morita
Yoko Moriwaki
Yukiko Motoya (born 1979), novelist, playwright
Kiyoko Murata (born 1945), novelist
Sayaka Murata (born 1979), novelist
Yuka Murayama
Mayumi Muroyama

N
Ai Nagai (born 1951), playwright
Rieko Nakagawa (born 1935), children's writer, poet
Aya Nakahara
Kyoko Nakajima (born 1964), novelist, essayist
Hisaya Nakajo
Hikaru Nakamura
Yoshiki Nakamura
Midori Nakano
Nakatsukasa
Kei Nakazawa (born 1959), novelist, essayist, professor
Kiriko Nananan
Lady Nijō
Kanako Nishi (born 1977), writer, novelist
Keiko Nishi
Yoshiko Nishitani
Princess Nukata

O
Anna Ogino
Mariko Ōhara
Nanase Ohkawa
Mari Okada
Reiko Okano
Kyoko Okazaki
Riku Onda (born 1964), novelist
Fuyumi Ono
Hiromu Ono
Natsume Ono
Masumi Oshima (born 1962), novelist
Yumiko Ōshima
Yōko Ōta
Shinobu Ohtaka
Ōtomo no Sakanoe no Iratsume
Hiroko Oyamada (born 1983), novelist
Mari Ozawa

R
Marimo Ragawa
Rieko Saibara
Rikei (1530–1611)

S
Megumu Sagisawa
Fumi Saimon
Mayu Sakai
Io Sakisaka
Momoko Sakura
Shino Sakuragi (born 1965), novelist, short story writer
Kanoko Sakurakoji
Erica Sakurazawa
Tomoko Sasaki
Sei Shōnagon
Yoshiko Sembon
Tomoka Shibasaki (born 1973), novelist
Yoshiko Shigekane (1927–1993), novelist
Karuho Shiina
Michiru Shimada
Rio Shimamoto (born 1983), novelist
Aki Shimazaki
Reiko Shimizu
Takako Shimura
Mayu Shinjo
Hotate Shinkawa, novelist
Setsuko Shinoda (born 1955), novelist
Chie Shinohara
Kazuko Shiraishi
Shunzei's Daughter
Fuyumi Soryo (born 1959), manga writer
Keiko Suenobu
Yuki Suetsugu
Suzumi Suzuki (born 1983), essayist and novelist
Takasue's Daughter

T
Haruko Tachiiri
Chimako Tada
Kaoru Tada
Tadano Makuzu
Nobuko Takagi
Rumiko Takahashi
Takako Takahashi
Kaoru Takamura (born 1953), novelist, essayist
Hinako Takanaga
Mitsuba Takanashi
Fumio Takano, novelist
Haneko Takayama (born 1975), novelist
Kazumi Takayama (born 1994), novelist, self-help author
Keiko Takemiya
Hiroko Takenishi
Kei Takeoka (born 1969), motoring journalist
Yumi Tamura
Yellow Tanabe
Meca Tanaka, manga writer
Mitsu Tanaka
Arina Tanemura
Yoko Tawada (born 1960), novelist, essayist, poet
Keiko Tobe
Yana Toboso
Hari Tokeino
Ema Tōyama
Masami Tsuda
Mikiyo Tsuda
Kikuko Tsumura (born 1978), novelist
Yūko Tsushima (1947–2016), novelist, essayist

U
Miwa Ueda
Toshiko Ueda
Kimiko Uehara
Chica Umino
Yuki Urushibara

W
Natsuto Wada (1920–1983), scriptwriter, columnist
Chisako Wakatake (born 1954), novelist
Masako Watanabe
Taeko Watanabe
Yuu Watase
Risa Wataya (born 1984), novelist

Y
Nanpei Yamada
Ryoko Yamagishi
Yūki Yamato (born 1989), screenwriter
Yamakawa Kikue
Mika Yamamoto
Kazumi Yamashita
Mari Yamazaki
Rie Yasumi
Ai Yazawa
Year 24 Group
Mari Yonehara
Akiko Yosano
Akimi Yoshida
Tomoko Yoshida
Nobuko Yoshiya
Wataru Yoshizumi
Yuasa Yoshiko
Kaori Yuki
Shigeko Yuki
Sumomo Yumeka
Asako Yuzuki (born 1981), novelist

See also
List of Japanese writers
List of women writers
List of Japanese-language poets

-
Writers, List of Japanese
Japanese women writers, List of
+Women